An experiment is a set of observations performed in the context of solving a particular problem or question.

Experiment may also refer to:

 Experiment (probability theory), a repeatable process with a fixed set of possible outcomes
 Experiment, Arkansas, an unincorporated community in the United States
 Experiment, Georgia, a census-designated place in the United States
 Experiment (1943 film), a Czech film
 Experiment (1988 film), a short Soviet film
 Experiment (game), a dedicated deck card game
 Experiment (Lilo & Stitch), any one of a series of fictional genetically engineered characters from the Lilo & Stitch franchise
 Experiment (locomotive), an 1833 steam locomotive
 Experiment, an 1835 railway coach used at the Stockton and Darlington Railway's opening
 Experiment (ship), any one of a number of vessels, naval and mercantile
 Experiment (website), a crowdfunding website
 Experiment (album), a 2018 album by Kane Brown

See also
 
 
 Experimentalism
 Experiment Farm
 The Experiment (disambiguation)